Volodymyr Dakhno (March 7, 1932, Zaporizhzhia — July 28, 2006, Kyiv, Ukraine) was a Ukrainian animator, animation film director and scriptwriter. He was a laureate of the Shevchenko National Prize of Ukraine (1988), and a People's Artist of Ukraine (1996). Dakhno was best known for the animation series Cossacks (Козаки) which featured characters who were Zaporozhian Cossacks.  He worked at Kievnauchfilm, also translated Kyivnaukfilm, which has since been renamed Ukranimafilm.

Volodymyr Dakhno was born on March 7, 1932, in Zaporizhzhia, Ukrainian SSR (now Ukraine).  His father was a colonel and his mother was a librarian; he was described as a "bookish" child who enjoyed drawing.  In an interview, he speculated that his upbringing in Zaporizhzhia contributed to his love of humor. 

After school he entered the Kyiv Medical Institute but almost immediately, he transferred to the Kyiv Civil Engineering Institute where he studied in the class of prominent Ukrainian architect Joseph Karakis. Relating his study of architecture to his work in animation, Dakhno said (translated): "It is the ability to create an image and see it in the mind. It is the same as an architect, when drawing the plan of a house, must clearly imagine the whole structure. You can be a talented person, but you cannot create a cartoon without a special vision. The thought, first of all, must be visualized in the director's imagination, and then, if lucky, it will come to life on the screen, become clear to the viewer."On March 7, 2013, Google released a Doodle in Dakhno's memory on his 81st birthday.

Filmography

See also 

 History of Ukrainian animation
 Kyivnaukfilm
 Shevchenko National Prize

References

Literature

External links

Volodymyr Dakhno at animator.ru
Ukranimafilm official site
https://www.youtube.com/ukranima
https://www.linkedin.com/company/-ukranimafilm

1932 births
2006 deaths
People from Zaporizhzhia
Ukrainian film directors
Ukrainian animators
Ukrainian animated film directors